Buffington may refer to:

Places in the United States
Communities
Buffington, Georgia
Buffington, Missouri
Buffington Township, Indiana County, Pennsylvania

Landmarks
Buffington Harbor, Gary, Indiana
Buffington Hotel, a historic building in Westville, Oklahoma
Buffington Island, in the Ohio River, between West Virginia and Ohio
Battle of Buffington Island, a battle of the American Civil War

People
Buffington (surname)